The  Little League World Series was held from August 21 to August 24 in Williamsport, Pennsylvania. The Lions Hondo Little League of Roswell, New Mexico, defeated the Delaware Township Little League of Delaware Township, New Jersey, in the championship game of the 10th Little League World Series. Delaware Township had also been runner-up in the  tournament.

As of 2021, this is the only time that a team from New Mexico has qualified for the Little League World Series.

Teams

Delaware Township was renamed Cherry Hill in November 1961

Bracket

Notable players
 Tom Jordan Jr., winning pitcher for New Mexico in the championship game, was the son of former MLB player Tom Jordan.

References

Further reading

External links
1956 Tournament Bracket via Wayback Machine
1956 Line Scores via Wayback Machine

Little League World Series
Little League World Series
Little League World Series